Naughty Dog is an American video game developer that was founded in 1984 by Andy Gavin and Jason Rubin. Based in Santa Monica, California, Naughty Dog was originally known as JAM Software until 1989, and began producing games for the Apple II system. Their first release, Math Jam, was an educational game for the system which Gavin and Rubin self-published in 1985. The following year, Jam developed the skiing game Ski Crazed, which was published by Michigan-based company Baudville for the Apple II. The partnership with Baudville continued for Dream Zone, an adventure game released for the Apple IIGS as well as the Amiga, Atari ST and DOS in 1987, before they left to work with Electronic Arts on Keef the Thief and Rings of Power. After a brief hiatus, Way of the Warrior was released for the 3DO in 1994, before Naughty Dog partnered with Sony Computer Entertainment, by whom they were later acquired in 2001.

Naughty Dog is known for developing the Crash Bandicoot series for Sony's PlayStation console. After launching the series with the first title in 1996, Naughty Dog  developed sequels Crash Bandicoot 2: Cortex Strikes Back and Crash Bandicoot: Warped, as well as spin-off Crash Team Racing, before their partnership with distributor Universal Interactive Studios ended. Two years after the release of Crash Team Racing, Naughty Dog returned in 2001 with a title for the PlayStation 2, Jak and Daxter: The Precursor Legacy, which spawned the Jak and Daxter series, it includes the sequels Jak II and Jak 3 and the spin-off Jak X: Combat Racing. The developer's next series was Uncharted, which consists of four main titles—Drake's Fortune (2007), Among Thieves (2009), Drake's Deception (2011), and A Thief's End (2016), and a standalone expansion, The Lost Legacy, (2017). Naughty Dog's most recent new intellectual property is The Last of Us, released for the PlayStation 3 in 2013 and for the PlayStation 4 as The Last of Us Remastered in 2014: a downloadable expansion, Left Behind, was released for the PlayStation 3 in 2014; a sequel, The Last of Us Part II, was released in 2020; a remake, The Last of Us Part I, was released for PlayStation 5 in 2022, and is due to release for Windows in 2023; and a multiplayer spinoff of the series is in development.

Video games

References

External links 

Naughty Dog video games